The 2015 Curlers Corner Autumn Gold Curling Classic was held from October 9 to 12 at the Calgary Curling Club in Calgary, Alberta as part of the World Curling Tour. The event was held in a triple-knockout format with a purse of $50,000.

In the final, Rachel Homan and her rink from Ottawa defeated Chelsea Carey's Calgary rink to win the event. Homan dropped into the last chance C event early on in the tournament, and won six straight games to capture the title.

Teams
The teams are listed as follows:

Knockout brackets

Source:

A event

B event

C event

Knockout results
All draw times listed in Mountain Time (UTC−07:00).

Draw 1
Friday, October 9, 9:30 am

Draw 2
Friday, October 9, 1:15 pm

Draw 3
Friday, October 9, 5:15 pm

Draw 4
Friday, October 9, 9:00 pm

Draw 5
Saturday, October 10, 9:00 am

Draw 6
Saturday, October 10, 12:45 pm

Draw 7
Saturday, October 10, 4:30 pm

Draw 8
Saturday, October 10, 8:15 pm

Draw 9
Sunday, October 11, 9:00 am

Draw 10
Sunday, October 11, 12:45 pm

Draw 11
Sunday, October 11, 4:30 pm

Draw 12
Sunday, October 11, 8:15 pm

Playoffs

Source:

Quarterfinals
Monday, October 12, 9:00 am

Semifinals
Monday, October 12, 12:15 pm

Final
Monday, October 12, 3:30 pm

Notes

References

External links
CurlingZone

Autumn Gold Curling Classic
2015 in Canadian curling
2015 in Alberta
October 2015 sports events in Canada
2015 in women's curling
2010s in Calgary